Wu Linfeng (born 16 July 1999) is a Chinese footballer currently playing as a forward for Zibo Cuju.

Career statistics

Club
.

References

1999 births
Living people
Chinese footballers
Chinese expatriate footballers
Association football forwards
China League Two players
China League One players
Botafogo Futebol Clube (SP) players
Suzhou Dongwu F.C. players
Zibo Cuju F.C. players
Chinese expatriate sportspeople in Brazil
Expatriate footballers in Brazil